H.G. Dr Yuhanon Mar Thevodors is the metropolitan of Kottarakkara Punalur Diocese of the Malankara Orthodox Syrian Church.

References
http://priests.malankaraorthodox.tv/?p=1494
http://marthoman.tv/church%20teachers/Existing%20Bishops.htm
http://malankaraorthodoxchurch.in/index.php?option=com_content&task=view&id=635&Itemid=520

Malankara Orthodox Syrian Church bishops
1953 births
Living people